Tustumena Lake (Dena'ina: Dusdu Bena) is a lake on the west side of the Kenai Peninsula in southcentral Alaska, within Kenai National Wildlife Refuge and near the town of Kasilof.  Access is only via the Kasilof River, as there are no roads that lead directly to the lake.

Overview 
At 73,437 acres Tustumena Lake is Alaska's eighth largest lake and the largest lake on the Kenai Peninsula. With a maximum depth of 950 feet, Tustumena Lake is exceptionally deep; it is deeper than Cook Inlet. The lake and the area around it are known for game hunting, and for the Tustumena 200 Sled Dog Race. Most of the land surrounding the lake is in the Kenai National Wildlife Refuge. This lake has a reputation for being very dangerous to small boats due to the high winds that regularly blow off of Tustumena Glacier.

History 
Early Russian explorers wrongly believed that this lake and Skilak Lake were a single body of water.  Early trophy hunters from the 1890s and later took world record moose from the north shore, and the first hunting guide to obtain a license to guide hunters in the State of Alaska called this area home.

References

Lakes of Kenai Peninsula Borough, Alaska
Lakes of Alaska